Birds of Prey is a 1973 television film directed by William A. Graham and starring David Janssen, Ralph Meeker, and Elayne Heilveil. The screenplay was written by Robert Boris from a story by Boris and Rupert Hitzig. It is a crime action film depicting a radio station helicopter traffic reporter who, witnessing an armored car robbery, engages in a chase when the suspects flee in a vehicle and then switch to their own get-away helicopter.

Plot
A former American Volunteer Group pilot, Harry Walker (David Janssen), who flies a Hughes 500C helicopter for Salt Lake City radio station KBEX as a traffic reporter, is introduced flying and singing along to Three Little Fishies (the song was changed to another in VHS and DVD versions of the film) and then doing an afternoon rush-hour report during a station nostalgia promotion in which standards from the World War II era are being played on-air. Opening credits run over aerial combat footage borrowed from the 1942 Republic Pictures film Flying Tigers, then segues into footage of a Curtiss P-40 Warhawk, in full sharkmouth scheme, being towed along the highway to the radio station by Walker as part of the promotion.

Walker's ex-AVG squadron mate, Captain Jim "Mac" McAndrew, now a communications officer with the Salt Lake City Police, responds in a squad car to the radio station and challenges Walker on whether he has paperwork for hauling the fighter on public streets, which he does. They reminisce about their wartime experiences years ago, pointing out their different viewpoints: Walker in the past, and McAndrew, "in front of a computer", in the present.

Meanwhile, two bearded men are seen breaking into an Army National Guard Armory and stealing canister grenades.

As McAndrew and another officer drive away from the radio station, Mac comments that one would think that Walker might act his age, characterizing him as a "Smilin' Jack".

Back in the air, Walker observes an armed robbery of an armored car at the Zion's Bank in downtown Salt Lake City in which bearded men gun down the guards and grab a canvas sack of currency, then grab a female hostage and shove her into their getaway car. Reporting what he has seen to a disbelieving McAndrew over the radio, Walker pursues the car and describes the vehicle, its license number, and the suspects' descriptions. During the chase, the helicopter flies under several highway overpasses near the Union Pacific railyard before the getaway vehicle drives up into a multi-level garage, where the police and Walker think that they have the bandits cornered. To his surprise, an Aérospatiale SA 315B Lama (mistakenly listed in the end credits as an "Alouette") rises up from the far side of the garage structure and the suspects abandon their vehicle for the helicopter, taking the female hostage with them, but not before a pursuing police officer shoots one of the robbers with his side arm as the man tries to flee.

Walker then continues the aerial pursuit as the robbers attempt to ram him and fly off. Low on fuel, Walker stops a gasoline tanker on U.S. Route 40 and tops up his fuel supply. He also offers to buy a shotgun from another driver after explaining the situation, but the driver refuses his cash and gives him the weapon. Walker continues the pursuit, while McAndrew informs him that fingerprints have identified two of the robbers as former Marines who served in Vietnam and they surmise that the chopper pilot is similarly experienced. The hostage is identified as Teresa Janice Shaw, a bank employee, who is due to get married that Friday.

The getaway helicopter attempts to hide in the open pit copper mine at Bingham, but Walker locates it sitting behind a giant shovel. The chase continues into Canyonlands. Both helicopters land and the robbers try to parlay with the radio station pilot over a loudspeaker, offering him a bribe as both aircraft sit on the ground. Exasperated by Walker's stubbornness, they ask what he wants, but Walker only replies "You!". The chase resumes, and when the robbers land to refuel from 55-gallon drums they have previously stashed in a remote location, one robber exits the helicopter with a shotgun, unseen by Walker, and holes his hydraulic line as the Hughes 500 flies past. When the remaining bandits wrestle with their fuel drums, T.J. (the hostage) grabs the money bag and flees through the underbrush. One robber chases her through thicket on foot while the getaway copter hovers overhead. Snatches of the 1930s big band tune "Sing, Sing, Sing" punctuate the chase. Walker, who had landed to patch his oil leak, then comes to the woman's rescue, knocking her foot pursuer flat with his landing skid, with the two helicopters hovering and circling over the bank employee, crouching in the blowing dust as they maneuver for position, a "birds of prey" scenario. Walker touches down next the woman and she climbs into his helicopter with the money. As twilight falls, and a thunderstorm approaches, Walker drops his chopper into a narrow canyon and eludes the pursuing robbers.

During the night, Walker and T.J. converse and exchange lines of dialogue from Casablanca while repairing the hydraulic line. She reveals that she has never been far from Salt Lake City in her 22 years and that she has known her fiancé since childhood. Walker states that he had failed marriages and advises her not to rush into nuptials. A gentle flirtation takes place and she kisses Walker three times, becoming somewhat infatuated with the dashing pilot, unlike anyone she has ever met. He stops the seduction before it goes any further, directing her to tune the radio to KBEX, which is playing Glenn Miller's "Moonlight Serenade".

The following morning, Walker raises a Continental Airlines flight on an emergency channel and asks the pilot to relay their location to the police. Determining that the robbers are close by and still searching for him, Walker directs the girl to go to the nearby highway and hitch-hike after he lifts off, but she doesn't want to leave him. He insists so that she doesn't get hurt and she leaves the money with him. Saying "So long, 22!" (a reference to her age), Walker takes off, with TJ screaming his last name, trying to make him change his mind.

The helicopter chase resumes; meanwhile, McAndrew and a police pilot in a Piper Arrow, alerted by the airline pilot, approach the area as well. The two helicopters fly to an abandoned airfield, where the bank employee said the robbers have a getaway plane and pilot to fly them to Mexico. The two choppers fly in and out of abandoned hangars, including a scene in which both hover inside a large one. Gunfire is exchanged and another bandit goes down, and Walker maneuvers his 500 past the Lama and blocks their escape. The police aircraft arrives and McAndrew runs to the hangar where Walker has cornered the bandit's helicopter inside, with Walker tossing the money out to his old AVG buddy. The bandit in the Lama throws a grenade out to the hangar door, forcing Walker to get out of the way of the blast; the Lama slips past and then chases after McAndrew, the bandits shooting at him. Walker then rams his helicopter into the bandit's aircraft to save his buddy. McAndrew, dazed, stares in disbelief at the burning wreckage, muttering, "Damn it, Walker. Nobody asked you to do that."

The police pilot runs over and McAndrew says that they are going after the pilot of the getaway plane, who has just fled in a Cessna 206 after seeing the crash. "What about Walker?" asks the police pilot. "What about him?" says McAndrew. The closing credits roll as the police aircraft is shown pursuing the other plane into the sunset with KBEX DJ banter over "I'll Get By".

Cast

David Janssen as Harry Walker
Ralph Meeker as McAndrew (although Walker calls him McAndrews in dialogue)
Elayne Heilveil as Teresa Janice "T.J." Shaw
Harry Klekas as Police Captain
Sam Dawson as Police Dispatcher
Don Wilbanks as Trucker
James Gavin as Police Pilot

Production
Birds of Prey was filmed in Salt Lake City, Utah, with final scenes shot at the recently closed Wendover Air Force Base, where the 509th Composite Group prepared for their atomic bomb missions in World War II with their Silverplate Boeing B-29 Superfortresses. Parts of the film were also shot in Canyonlands and Sevenmile Canyon in Utah.

The KBEX call letters were assigned to an FM station in Dalhart, Texas, by the Federal Communications Commission on February 20, 2013. Prior to 2013, KBEX was typically used as a stock call sign for fictional TV and radio stations in film, radio and television productions.

Subsequent releases of the film on TV, VHS and DVD have the songs Three Little Fishies, Sing, Sing, Sing and I'll Get By replaced by other songs of the era in a supposed music-rights dispute between CBS and the music rights holders. This has occurred with other CBS shows, such as Wiseguy (Moody Blues' Nights in White Satin) and Magnum, P.I. (John Denver's Looking for Space).

This was an ABC Movie of the Week, which aired on Tuesdays and Wednesdays.  Many movies were made for these nights.  The California Kid with Martin Sheen and Vic Morrow, Trilogy of Terror with Karen Black, Duel with Dennis Weaver, are examples of many of them.

References

External links

1973 television films
1973 films
American aviation films
1970s English-language films
CBS network films
Films shot in Utah
Films directed by William Graham (director)
Films scored by Jack Elliott
1970s American films